Senator Meyer may refer to:

J. Edward Meyer (born 1935), Connecticut State Senate
John P. Meyer (1920–2013), Illinois State Senate
Kevin Meyer (politician) (born 1956), Alaska State Senate
Mark Meyer (politician) (born 1963), Wisconsin State Senate
Schuyler M. Meyer (1885–1970), New York State Senate
Selina Meyer, fictional senator portrayed by Julia Louis-Dreyfus in Veep
Jan Meyers (1928–2019), Kansas State Senate

See also
Senator Meier (disambiguation)
Senator Mayer (disambiguation)